The Réseau Ferroviaire Rapide is an urban rail system under construction and development in Tunis, Tunisia that has experienced ongoing delays since 2007.  Reasons for the delays range from theft of equipment, work stoppages, lack of regional support, cost overruns, and the COVID-19 pandemic. 

As of September 2022,  "We have been hearing about the imminent inauguration of the Rapid Railway Network of Tunis (RFR) project for years. Except that each time, this inauguration is postponed to a later date without explanation."

A twenty five kilometer railroad which has existed since 1882, that connects Tunis to Borj Cédria, Tunisia, was set to be integrated into the Tunis RFR as line A of the network.

See also
Société des transports de Tunis
Transport in Tunisia
Tunis Light Metro

Website 
 Officiel website.

References

Rail transport in Tunisia
Tunis
Rapid transit in Tunisia